Dr. Mak Joon Wah is a Malaysian physician. He is an expert on tropical and parasitic diseases and has published over 350 scientific papers. He is Professor of Pathology (the equivalent of a named chair in North America) and Vice-President of the International Medical University (IMU). He has formerly been Director of the Institute for Medical Research (IMR) and has worked as a consultant to the World Health Organization. He was Director of the WHO Collaborating Centre for Lymphatic Filariasis. He was Professor of Pathology at the Universiti Putra Malaysia for three years before joining IMU.

He was elected President of Malaysian Society of Parasitology and Tropical Medicine in 1982 was the founding Editor of its Journal, Tropical Biomedicine, from 1985 to 1987.

He holds an MBBS from the University of Singapore (1967), a Master of Public Health (MPH) from the University of Malaya (1976), and Doctor of Medicine (MD) degree from the University of Singapore (1980). He became a Fellow of the Royal College of Pathologists in 1995.

Awards
National Science Award, 1985
Merdeka Award, 2011

See also 
 filariasis

References

Academic staff of the International Medical University
Malaysian tropical physicians
Living people
Malaysian people of Chinese descent
Malaysian pathologists
Malaysian parasitologists
People from Penang
1942 births